The Palm Beach Waves were an indoor football team.  They were a 2007 expansion member National Indoor Football League.  They played their home games at the Jim Brandon Equestrian Center in West Palm Beach, Florida.  This is the second attempt of an NIFL team in West Palm Beach after the 2006 failure of the West Palm Beach Phantoms. NIFL Florida Division suspended in early 2007.

Season-By-Season 

|-
|2007 || 1 || 2 || 0 || 4th Atlantic Florida || --

External links
Official Website

National Indoor Football League teams
West Palm Beach, Florida
American football teams in Florida
Sports in Palm Beach County, Florida
2006 establishments in Florida